Francesco Stefano Antonioli  (born 14 September 1969) is an Italian former footballer who played as goalkeeper. He was the oldest footballer in Serie A until his club Cesena were relegated to Serie B at the end of the 2011–12 season, after which he retired from professional football. Antonioli began his club career with Monza and played for several Italian clubs throughout his career, winning titles with A.C. Milan, Bologna and Roma. Despite never being capped at senior international level, he was an unused member of the Italy squad the took part at Euro 2000, reaching the final. At youth level, he represented Italy at the 1992 Summer Olympics.

Club career
Born in Monza, Italy, Antonioli developed as a player in the youth ranks of A.C. Milan. He was later loaned out to Monza, making his professional debut with the club in 1986, at the age of 16, in a 1–0 defeat to Juventus in the Coppa Italia. He also made his Milan debut in the Coppa Italia, in a 2–1 home win over Lazio, on 3 September 1988, and made his Serie A debt with the club on 18 April 1992, in a 1–0 win over cross-city rivals Inter. Due to some promising performances, he was brought to the Milan starting lineup at the beginning of the 1992–93 season, featuring in Milan's 2–1 victory over Parma in the 1992 Supercoppa Italiana; however, a string of mistakes, including a dreadful fumble in the Milan derby, which gifted Luigi de Agostini a soft goal, allowed Sebastiano Rossi to reclaim his starting spot in goal. Milan won the league title that season, also reaching the final of the UEFA Champions League. Antonioli made his final appearance for Milan on 29 November 1992, in 1–0 away win over Juventus, in Serie A, making 27 appearances for the club in total.

After joining Bologna in 1995, he became the undisputed first-choice keeper for the club (apart from the 1997–98 season, during which he backed up Giorgio Sterchele); he immediately helped the club obtain Serie A promotion, winning the 1995–96 Serie B title, later helping Bologna to win the 1998 UEFA Intertoto Cup, and subsequently reach the semi-finals of the 1998–99 UEFA Cup and the Coppa Italia. In 1999, he joined Roma for 10 billion Italian lire and in 2001, he won a Scudetto and a Supercoppa Italiana with A.S. Roma, also reaching the final of the Coppa Italia in 2003.

In the summer of 2003, Antonioli joined U.C. Sampdoria on a free transfer. In 2006–07, with Luca Castellazzi's emergence between the posts, Antonioli left for former club Bologna on another free transfer.

He led Bologna to win Serie A promotion once again in mid-2008.

After the end of 2008–09 season, he was released and replaced by U21 internationals Emiliano Viviano. Antonioli then joined Serie B newcomer A.C. Cesena in July and the club sent the former first choice Nicola Ravaglia to lower division. He was the first choice ahead Michele Tardioli. Antonioli was also protagonist of the club's second consecutive promotion in 2010, thus having another chance of top flight football at the age of 41 in the 2010–11 Serie A season. The team survived from relegation battle by finished 15th and he was offered a new 1-year contract.

International career
Antonioli never debuted for the senior side, but was selected in the Italy squad that finished second at Euro 2000, as third-choice goalkeeper, behind Gianluigi Buffon and Francesco Toldo. When Gianluigi Buffon, injured himself in an international friendly warm-up a few days before the beginning of the tournament, Antonioli became second-choice ahead of Buffon's replacement in the squad Christian Abbiati.

Antonioli was the first-choice goalkeeper of the Italy national under-21 football team that won the 1992 UEFA European Under-21 Championship; with the Italian squad, he also took part in the 1992 Olympic Games.

Style of play
An experienced and authoritative presence in goal, Antonioli was regarded as one of Italy's most talented and promising goalkeepers in his youth, although several pundits consider him to have failed to realise his potential due to several injuries as well as his character. Due to his elegant playing style, shot-stopping abilities, reflexes, and excellent goalkeeping technique, he was capable of producing spectacular, decisive, and stylish saves. However, his style of goalkeeping was predominantly efficient, and was inspired by that of his role model Giovanni Galli. Known for his penalty–saving abilities, with 14 stops in 416 appearances between 1992 and 2012, he has parried the joint–seventh–most penalties in Serie A history, alongside Stefano Sorrentino.

Honours
Milan
 Serie A: 1991–92, 1992–93
 European Cup: 1988–89, 1989–90
 Intercontinental Cup: 1989, 1990
 European Super Cup: 1989, 1990
 Supercoppa Italiana: 1988, 1992, 1993

Bologna
 Serie B: 1995–96
 UEFA Intertoto Cup: 1998

A.S. Roma
 Serie A: 2000–01
 Supercoppa Italiana: 2001
Italy
 UEFA European Championship: 2000 (Runner-up)
Orders
  5th Class / Knight: Cavaliere Ordine al Merito della Repubblica Italiana: 2000

References

External links
 
 Francesco Antonioli National Team Stats at FIGC.it 
 
 Francesco Antonioli Interview

1969 births
Living people
Sportspeople from Monza
Association football goalkeepers
Italian footballers
A.C. Milan players
A.C. Monza players
A.C. Cesena players
Modena F.C. players
Pisa S.C. players
A.C. Reggiana 1919 players
Bologna F.C. 1909 players
A.S. Roma players
U.C. Sampdoria players
Serie A players
Serie B players
Serie C players
Italy under-21 international footballers
Footballers at the 1992 Summer Olympics
Olympic footballers of Italy
UEFA Euro 2000 players
Footballers from Lombardy
Knights of the Order of Merit of the Italian Republic